The Wretched Spawn is the ninth studio album by American death metal band Cannibal Corpse. It was released on February 24, 2004 by Metal Blade Records. The cover art is by Vincent Locke. This is the last studio album to feature guitarist Jack Owen, one of the band's founding members, and up to the 2012 album Torture, the last with an album cover depicting violence and gore. The album was distributed with a making-of DVD produced by Nick Sahakian. The Wretched Spawn is Cannibal Corpse's fourth album to be named after one of the tracks on the album, after Butchered at Birth, The Bleeding and Gallery of Suicide.

Song meanings 
"For songs like "Nothing Left to Mutilate", and "Decency Defied", I looked to friends for ideas they had. "Decency [Defied]" was based on a friend who had a nightmare that her tattoos were being torn off while she was still alive. "Nothing Left [to Mutilate]" was based on ideas from a friend who was studying pheromones in college, and told me all about how a woman's scent drives men crazy. So if my imagination doesn't kick in, I draw from other things. "Slain" was based on the Eastwood film High Plains Drifter. And "Festering in the Crypt" is my own idea of dealing with the finality of death."- Jack Owen

Track listing

Credits 
Cannibal Corpse
 George "Corpsegrinder" Fisher – vocals
 Pat O'Brien – lead guitar
 Jack Owen – rhythm guitar
 Alex Webster – bass
 Paul Mazurkiewicz – drums

Charts

References

External links 
 
 The Wretched Spawn at Metal Blade Records

2004 albums
Albums produced by Neil Kernon
Cannibal Corpse albums
Metal Blade Records albums
Albums recorded at Sonic Ranch